The Medical and Dental Defence Union of Scotland (MDDUS) is one of three major medical defence organisations (MDOs) in the UK and offers professional indemnity and expert medico-legal and dento-legal advice for doctors, dentists and other healthcare professionals throughout the United Kingdom. MDDUS is a mutual organisation and was founded in 1902.  It is recognised by the UK's General Medical Council.

At the University of Glasgow, the MDDUS offers the "Medical and Dental Defence Union of Scotland Prize for Medical Jurisprudence" annually.

References

External links
 

 

Scottish medical associations
1902 establishments in Scotland
Organizations established in 1902
Scots law
Medical jurisprudence
United Kingdom contract law